Moel yr Ewig is a top of Cadair Berwyn in north east Wales. It lies on ridge heading south from Cadair Berwyn's summit. The summits of Godor and Godor North Top are to be found further down the ridge.

The summit is a grassy knoll marked by a few stones.

References

External links
 www.geograph.co.uk : photos of Cadair Berwyn and surrounding area

Hewitts of Wales
Mountains and hills of Denbighshire
Mountains and hills of Powys
Nuttalls

cy:Cadair Berwyn